Ukraine competed at the 2013 Winter Universiade in Trentino, Italy. 92 Ukrainian athletes (sixth largest team behind Russia, Japan, Canada, United States, and Italy) competed in 9 sports out of 12 except for curling, freestyle skiing, and speed skating. Ukraine won 9 medals, 3 of which were gold, and ranked 8th.

Medallists

Figure skating

See also
 Ukraine at the 2013 Summer Universiade

References

Sources
 Results in alpine skiing
 Results in biathlon
 Results in cross-country skiing
 Results in freestyle skiing
 Results in Nordic combined
 Results in short track speed skating
 Results in ski jumping
 Results in snowboarding
 Results in speed skating

2013 Winter Universiade
Ukraine at the Winter Universiade
Winter Universiade
Nations at the 2013 Winter Universiade